"Tippa My Tongue" is a song by American alternative rock band Red Hot Chili Peppers and the first single from the band's thirteenth studio album Return of the Dream Canteen. The single, along with a music video, was released on August 19, 2022.

"Tippa My Tongue" became the band's fourth number-one single on the Rock & Alternative Airplay chart and made them the only band with two number-one singles on that chart in 2022, the other being "Black Summer". On the Alternative Airplay chart, the song reached the 15th number one and became the band's 27th top ten single on that chart, one shy of the record held by the Foo Fighters.

Background

First mentioned onstage by Flea and Kiedis alongside the announcement of the full album in Denver, Colorado, "Tippa My Tongue" is an upbeat funk rock song. Drummer Chad Smith described the track's influences as: "It's got P-Funk in it. I hear George [Clinton in it], and some Hendrixy kind of licks."

Music video

The music video for the song was directed by Malia James. The psychedelic imagery of the video was described as "trippy" by Louder and NME. Far Out Magazine described the setting as "a psychedelic world filled with geometric shapes and technicolour hues."

Live performances
Nearly five months after its release, the song made its live debut on January 14, 2023, at the iHeartRadio ALTer Ego music festival in Inglewood, CA.

Personnel

Anthony Kiedis – vocals
Flea – bass
John Frusciante – guitar
Chad Smith – drums

Additional personnel 

Rick Rubin – production
Ryan Hewitt – engineering

Charts

Weekly charts

Year-end charts

References

2022 singles
2022 songs
Red Hot Chili Peppers songs
Songs written by Anthony Kiedis
Songs written by Chad Smith
Songs written by Flea (musician)
Songs written by John Frusciante